Cracked Eggs and Noodles is a 2005 South Korean comedy film. It received 1,193,150 admissions nationwide during its theatrical release.

It was also one of four Korean movies that screened at the 2006 International Fajr Film Festival in Iran.

Plot
Dae-gyu is a working man living a stress-free dating life until one day a young boy claiming to be his son pays him an unexpected visit. After much wavering and struggle to make his son go away, Dae-gyu makes a compromise to go on a road trip after which he would return the boy to his mother.

References

External links 
 
 
 

2005 films
2000s Korean-language films
South Korean comedy-drama films
2000s South Korean films